Every 9 Seconds, is a 1997 television film directed by Kenneth Fink. It stars former NYPD Blue co-star, Gail O'Grady, Amy Pietz, and former Law & Order: Special Victims Unit star, Christopher Meloni. The film debuted on NBC on October 12, 1997 at 9/8c. The film occasionally re-airs on Lifetime as well as its sister channel Lifetime Movie Network.

Plot 
The films deal with a woman named Carrie (Amy Pietz), a crisis line worker searching for Janet (O'Grady), an abused woman who calls the hotline trying to proclaim revenge against her abusive ex-husband, Richard (Christopher Meloni). Another story deals with another teen who declines help from the crisis center and is attacked not long after by her abusive boyfriend.

Cast
Gail O'Grady as Janet
Amy Pietz as Carrie
Christopher Meloni as Richard Sutherland
Emily Hampshire as Missy
Michael Riley as Ray
Scott Speedman as Greg
Sean McCann as Mike McConnell
Mimi Kuzyk as Carol

References

External links

1997 television films
1997 films
NBC network original films
1990s English-language films